Banded Peak may refer to:

Banded Peak (Alberta), a mountain in Alberta, Canada
Banded Peak (Antarctica), a mountain in Antarctica